Arthur Dewar, Lord Dewar KC (14 March 1860 – 14 June 1917) was a British politician and judge who served as a Liberal Member of Parliament (MP) for Edinburgh South as well as Solicitor General for Scotland and later a Senator of the College of Justice.

Life

He was born in Perth, the fourth son of John Dewar, Sr. the distiller and founder of John Dewar & Sons. His brothers, Thomas and John, ran the family business.

He was educated at Perth Academy and then at the University of Edinburgh, graduating in 1882. He was admitted to the Scottish Bar in 1885, and in 1892 was appointed the Advocate-Depute for the Glasgow circuit, a minor governmental post, which he held until 1895 when the Conservative Party came into power.

In an 1899 by-election he was elected as the Member of Parliament for Edinburgh South, defeating Major-General A.G. Wauchope, but was defeated himself in the 1900 general election by Sir Andrew Agnew. He stood again in the 1906 general election, where he won the seat. He had been made King's Counsel in 1904, and served as Solicitor General for Scotland from February 1909 – 1910.

He was re-elected in the January 1910 general election, but resigned from the Commons in April that year when he was appointed a Senator of the College of Justice, replacing the deceased McLaren. He took the judicial title of Lord Dewar, and served in the post until his death.

He lived 8 Drumsheugh Gardens in Edinburgh's West End an impressive Victorian townhouse by the Edinburgh architect John Lessels.

He is buried in the 20th century extension to Dean Cemetery in Edinburgh, against the northmost wall.

Family

He married Letitia ("Lettie") Dalrymple Bell, daughter of Robert Bell of Clifton Hall, in 1892, with whom he had one son and one daughter.

His son, Ian Dalrymple Dewar, was killed during the First World War.

Notes

References
 Burke's Landed Gentry – The Kingdom of Scotland. 19th Edition, Volume I 
 "DEWAR", in 
 Obituary in The Times, 15 June 1917, p. 3

External links 
 

1860 births
1917 deaths
Scottish Liberal Party MPs
Members of the Parliament of the United Kingdom for Edinburgh constituencies
Solicitors General for Scotland
Dewar
Members of the Faculty of Advocates
People from Perth, Scotland
UK MPs 1895–1900
UK MPs 1906–1910
UK MPs 1910
Alumni of the University of Edinburgh
People educated at Perth Academy
Scottish King's Counsel
20th-century King's Counsel